Bagat-en-Quercy (literally Bagat in Quercy; Languedocien: Bagat de Carcin) is a former commune in the Lot department in southwestern France. On 1 January 2019, it was merged into the new commune Barguelonne-en-Quercy.

Geography
The Séoune forms parts of the commune's northern border. The small town of Montcuq is 3 km away and has a variety of shops and facilities including supermarkets, banks, petrol stations, pharmacy, doctors, restaurants, bars and a thriving Sunday market.

Population

See also
Communes of the Lot department

References

Former communes of Lot (department)
Populated places disestablished in 2019